Jordan Hoffman is an American freelance film critic and former actor, director, and producer. He is best known for his work with New York Daily News, The Guardian, Film.com, Vanity Fair, ScreenCrush, and The Times of Israel. He is also a contributor to Badass Digest and StarTrek.com.  He is the host of Engage: The Official Star Trek Podcast. He is a member of the New York Film Critics Circle.

Previously he was the movies editor at UGO.com.   He wrote, produced and appeared in films such as Ultrachrist! and Body/Antibody.

In 2004, he was named IFC's Ultimate Film Fanatic of the North East. In 2012, he appeared on episode 36 of the podcast On Cinema as a special guest to review the movie 300.

References

External links

American film critics
Living people
American male non-fiction writers
21st-century American non-fiction writers
Year of birth missing (living people)
21st-century American male writers